is a Japanese footballer who plays for Fujieda MYFC.

Club statistics
Updated to 23 February 2018.

References

External links
Profile at Fujieda MYFC

Profile at Zweigen Kanazawa

1990 births
Living people
Meiji University alumni
Association football people from Kanagawa Prefecture
Japanese footballers
J2 League players
J3 League players
Japan Football League players
Zweigen Kanazawa players
Fujieda MYFC players
Association football defenders